"Casualty" is the third television play episode of the second season of the Australian anthology television series Australian Playhouse. "Casualty" was written by John Croyston and originally aired on ABC on 3 July 1967 in Melbourne and on 7 August 1967 in Sydney.

Premise
A story centered around a hospital waiting room.

Cast
 Ben Gabriel
 Shirley Cameron
 Martin Harris
 Bowen Llewellyn
 Ed Nelson

Reception
A reviewer in The Age called it "a waste of viewing time".

Another writer in that paper called it "stylised".

The Sydney Morning Herald complained about Croyston's "airy fairy artsy farsty script".

References

External links
 
 
 Complete script at National Archives of Australia

1967 television plays
1967 Australian television episodes
1960s Australian television plays
Australian Playhouse (season 2) episodes